James Lee (born January 17, 1956) is a retired American basketball player.  He won an NCAA championship at the University of Kentucky and was a second-round draft pick in the 1978 NBA draft.

Lee, a 6'5" swingman from Henry Clay High School in Lexington, Kentucky, played college basketball for his hometown Kentucky Wildcats.  He was a key player for four years and averaged 11.3 points per game on 56% shooting as the sixth man on the Wildcats' 1978 national championship team.

Coming off a championship year, Lee was drafted in the second round of the 1978 NBA Draft (39th pick overall) by the Seattle SuperSonics, but never played in the NBA.  Lee played for the Western Basketball Association's Tucson Gunners for one season, then played several years in the Continental Basketball Association.  His best year came during the 1980–81 CBA season where Lee averaged 22.3 points per game for the Lehigh Valley Jets.

References

1956 births
Living people
American men's basketball players
Basketball players from Lexington, Kentucky
Kentucky Wildcats men's basketball players
Lehigh Valley Jets players
Louisville Catbirds players
Maine Lumberjacks players
Seattle SuperSonics draft picks
Shooting guards
Small forwards